St. Rocco's Roman Catholic Church is a historic Roman Catholic parish church located within the Archdiocese of Newark at 212—216 Hunterdon Street in Newark, Essex County, New Jersey, United States.

History
St. Rocco's (Italian) Roman Catholic Church was founded on August 5, 1899, when Rev James Zuccarelli was appointed to open a new mission.  The cornerstone of the church was laid on March 12, 1900, with the dedication occurring on May 30, 1900.  The parish school was founded in 1906.
It was added to the National Register in 1980.

See also 
 National Register of Historic Places listings in Essex County, New Jersey

References

Italian-American culture in New Jersey
Roman Catholic churches completed in 1926
Roman Catholic churches in New Jersey
Churches on the National Register of Historic Places in New Jersey
Roman Catholic churches in Newark, New Jersey
National Register of Historic Places in Newark, New Jersey
New Jersey Register of Historic Places
20th-century Roman Catholic church buildings in the United States